iReview stands for online reputation accreditation iReview.com (a company of The Social Plus Holding LLC) for the aggregation of all online reviews of Internet content, including Google, Facebook, Yelp, Travelocity and hundreds of other sources. It is an innovation of rating businesses based on real online reputation, based on what customers are saying about a business.
It was initially called iRevU [irevu.com], established in 2016 in Miami, Florida, then acquired in 2021 by The Social Plus Holding LLC, registered in Chicago, IL Founder and CEO Ornis Mala. 

On a side note, 95% of the Companies rely on their reviews to drive their business. In today's day and age, over 80% of customer rely on online reviews before they visit or purchase anything in person or online. A known tech company bases its loss estimate on an industry study by Real Control Center, which found that a single negative online review can cost a business up to $3,000 annually, combined with the data in its own survey.

Recommender systems
heir own opinions by visiting the sites themselves.